Caudan is a commune in the Morbihan department of Brittany in north-western France.INSEE commune file The writer Yvonne Chauffin (1905–1995), laureate of the Prix Breizh in 1970, died in Caudan.

Demographics
Inhabitants of Caudan are called in French Caudanais.

Geography

Caudan is a suburb of Lorient city, located north of the town of Lanester.

See also
Communes of the Morbihan department

References

External links

Mayors of Morbihan Association 

Communes of Morbihan